Kristina Maria Chalhoub (born 14 May 1989 in Ottawa, Ontario) is a Canadian pop singer-songwriter.

Early life
Kristina Maria Chalhoub was raised in Ottawa, Ontario. She joined her school's choir as a second-grader, and wrote her first song in third grade. By the age of 12, she participated in talent shows in Ottawa and spent time in local studios recording demos. She also enrolled in dance classes and took formal lessons at the Canadian Conservatory of Music in Ottawa singing in many styles, from pop to opera to R&B. She graduated from Garneau High School.

In 2005, her vocal coach sent Kristina and a group named The Showstoppers with seven other girls to perform medleys of ABBA and Motown hits at theme parks including Disney World, Universal Studios, and SeaWorld.

Career
In the summer of 2009, veteran music industry executive Vito Luprano (Céline Dion, Garou) heard some of Kristina Maria's recordings and the pair signed an exclusive artist development deal under Luprano's music label Lupo One.

She released her first single, "Let's Play", which peaked at number 19 on the Canadian Hot 100, on 11 June 2011 followed by "Co-Pilot" reaching number 26 on the Canadian Hot 100, prompting her to record a bilingual English/French version with Corneille and a hit in French Singles Chart peaking at number 33. Her third single, "Our Song Comes On" reached number 23 on the Canadian Hot 100 in 2012. Kristina Maria went on tour in Canada in 2011, promoting the upcoming release of her debut album, Tell the World. Also on the tour were Hedley, MAGIC!, Ellie Goulding, Tegan and Sara, Karl Wolf, Mia Martina, JRDN, and her dancers; two members of Blueprint Cru from America's Best Dance Crew. Kristina promoted artist merchandise on tour and online partnered by Ottawa Shirt Printing. The album was released in April 2012 on Luprano's label, Lupo One. In 2012, Kristina Maria performed alongside featured artist Corneille in Agadir, Morocco at The Concert for Tolerance in an effort to promote open mindedness. In 2013, Tell the World was nominated for a Juno Award for Pop Album of the Year alongside nominees Justin Bieber, Carly Rae Jepsen, Nelly Furtado, and Victoria Duffield. In 2014, Kristina released "Move Like a Soldier" peaking at number 22 on the Canadian Hot 100. Off the stage, Kristina continued to develop her songwriting career co-writing with Kristian Lundin, Savan Kotecha, Mark Fiest, JC Chasez, Billy Steinberg, and BC Jean.

In 2017, the release of Kristina's single "Gone in a Minute" was canceled as Kristina terminated her management and publishing contract with Lupo One to pursue her music career as an artist and songwriter independently.

Discography

Albums

Singles

References

External links
 
 Official Youtube

1989 births
Living people
21st-century Canadian women singers
Canadian women pop singers
Canadian women singer-songwriters
Canadian people of Lebanese descent
Canadian pop singers
Fontana North artists
Musicians from Ottawa